Hefazat-e-Islam Bangladesh is a far-right Islamic Advocacy group of madrassah teachers and students. In 2013, it submitted to the government of Bangladesh a 13-point charter, which included the demand for the enactment of a blasphemy law.

History
Hefazat-e-Islam was formed in 2010, as a pressure group comprising the teachers of several madrasas at Chittagong, Bangladesh. The formation was allegedly triggered by the 2009 "Women Development Policy" draft. On 24 February 2010, Hefazat wanted to hold a rally at Laldighi Maidan, Chittagong to protest the government's move to slap a ban on religion-based politics, cancellation of the Fifth Amendment to the Constitution, and a proposed education policy that would have ended madrasah education. The police refused their request to hold a rally and injured 19 protesters. A few of these madrasa students were arrested by police and later released. In 2011, Hefajat-e-Islam protested some aspects of the proposed Women Development Policy.

According to The Economist, Hefazat is financed by doctrinaire Islamists in Saudi Arabia.

Leadership 

Ahmad Shafi, the former director of Hathazari Madrasa, Allama Junaid Babunagari the present Amir-e-Hefajat and Mufti Izharul Islam, the chairman of the Islamist party Islami Oikya Jote, Abdul Malek Halim, founder and principle of the first women Qawmi madrasah (Haildhar Madrasah) in Bangladesh are regarded as the founders of Hefazat-e-Islam. Nurul Islam Jihadi is the secretary general of the organization.

13-point demand agitation
In 2013 Hefajat-e-Islam was reformed after the allegation that some of the protesters in the Shahbag protests, were involved in publishing of content offensive to Muslims on blogs, including the depiction of Muhammad as a pornographic character. They arranged a rally towards capital city Dhaka, demanding enaction of capital punishment of the "atheist bloggers" involved in the Shahbag movement and a blasphemy law.

The 13 points of the Islamist group includes:
 Restore the phrase "Complete faith and trust in the Almighty Allah" in the constitution.
 Pass a law in parliament keeping a provision of the capital punishment of death sentence to prevent defaming Islam.
 Taking measures for stringent punishment of self-declared atheists and bloggers, who led the Shahbagh movement, and anti-Islamists who made derogatory remarks against Prophet Muhammad. Also taking steps to stop the spread of "propaganda".
 Stopping infiltration of all "alien-culture", including "shamelessness" in the name of individual's freedom of expression, anti-social activities, adultery, free mixing of males and females and candle-lighting. Women must be encouraged to wear hijab and their overall security must be ensured. Stopping harassment of women, open fornication and adultery, sexual harassment, all forms of violence against women and an end to the tradition of dowry.
 Make Islamic education mandatory from primary to higher secondary levels canceling the women policy and anti-religion education policy.
 Officially declare Ahmadiyyas as non-Muslim.
 Stopping erection of sculptures at intersections, schools, colleges and universities across the country.
 Lifting restrictions on prayers for ulema in all mosques across the country, including Baitul Mukarram National Mosque.
 Stopping Anti-Islamic content in media.
 Halt to anti-Islam activities by NGOs across the country, including in the Chittagong Hill Tracts; Hefazat fears a "foreign conspiracy" to separate Chittagong Hill Tracts from Bangladesh and make it a Christian state.
 Stop attacks and extrajudicial killing of ulema.
 Stopping harassment of teachers and students of Qawmi madrassas and ulema.
 Freedom for all arrested ulema and madrassa students and withdrawal of all cases filed against them, compensation for the victims, and bringing the assailants to justice.

Long march in April 2013
On 6 April 2013, Hefazat-e-Islam organized a long march towards the Motijheel area in Dhaka from Chittagong, Sylhet and Rajshahi to push for their 13-point demand. This was dubbed by some in the media as the "Siege of Dhaka". Awami League leader Nowsher Khan died of head injuries during a clash between his party activists and those of Hifazat-e Islam at Bhanga in Faridpur district. Hefazat supporters also attacked at a rally of Ghatak Dalal Nirmul Committee in Dhaka from their procession, injuring several people including a policeman. Hefazat supporters also attacked and injured Afsar Ahmed, the pro vice chancellor of Jahangirnagar University, and reportedly threatened journalists.

5–6 May protests

On 5 May 2013, Hefajat arranged a rally at the capital city, Dhaka, in the demand of their 13 points. On 4 May 2013, Hefazat activists gathered at all six entrance routes to Dhaka; creating a blockade, from dawn on 5 May 2013. At noon, with the permission of Dhaka Metropolitan Police (DMP), activists entered Dhaka and started moving towards Baitul Mukarram National Mosque in order to attend a prayer service. However activists of Hefazat-e- Islam were attacked by the ruling Awami League activists at various places using lethal arms such as pistols and guns who were using the Gulistan Road to reach Shapla Square. In return, Hefazat activists threw bricks at them. During the clashes, two television journalists were injured, apparently by Hefazat protesters. At about 3:00 pm while Hefazat leaders were delivering speeches, the Secretary General of Awami League, Sayed Ashraful Islam, at a press conference, threatened them to leave Dhaka. On the other hand, the opposition party Bangladesh Nationalist Party (BNP) asserted that Hefazat members had a democratic right to assemble and articulate their cause. Hefazat  supporters reportedly set fire to book stores located beside the south gate of the Baitul Mukarram during their program, inadvertently burning copies of Qurans, and assaulting two reporters. However, reports of this event are disputed, and Hefazat denies burning any books. According to BNP leader MK Anwar, the Qurans were burned by Debashih, leader of the ruling party Awami League's wing, the Swechchhasebak League. Hefazat also denies the violent incidents of vandalism and arson attributed to it.

In the early hours of 6 May security forces, drawn from police, the elite Rapid Action Battalion and paramilitary Border Guard Bangladesh jointly launched an operation named "Operation Secure Shapla" to prevent Hefazat's violence by driving them out from Dhaka. At the beginning of operation, police cut the power supply in the city's commercial area, but the total operation was live telecasted over few TV channel. During the course of the operations, two television channels, Diganta Television and Islamic TV, were shut down.

Casualties
According to government estimates, the number of casualties in this operation was 11, including a few law enforcement members, while the Daily Star gave as little as 5 deaths. This figure was dismissed by Human Rights Watch and other news agencies. Hefazat and the BNP initially claimed that 2000-3000 had been killed in the operations. British journalist confirmed that at least 36 people had died. which is also rejected by government. According to The Economist, European diplomats, as many as 50 people were killed in Dhaka, which didn't provide any diplomat's name.
Because of the differing views, Human Rights Watch called for an independent body to investigate the protest deaths. the poet and activist Farhad Mazhar said the government and media were making a cover-up and disinformation campaign. Human Rights Watch disputes opposition claims of 200 deaths, but agrees that a massacre occurred. Amnesty International demanded that Bangladesh government set up an independent and impartial investigation immediately to look into police excesses. UN Secretary General Ban Ki Moon voiced concern over the killing of unarmed protesters in Bangladesh and requested the government to sit with religious and political leaders.

On 6 May, the protests spread across the country. In Narayanganj, students and teachers of a local madrasa held protests and blockaded the Dhaka-Chittagong highway.  In return, police fired several hundred gunshots, killing 27 people. In Hathazari Upazila, Chittagong, six people were shot dead by police. In Bagerhat, one Hefazat member died in a clash between protesters and police.

Lawsuits
The government has filed 12 cases against top leaders of the Hefazat-e Islam for murder, vandalism, arson and destruction of properties and other charges, after a demand for impartial investigations from supporting organizations. In 2014, a case was filed with the International Criminal Court against 25 Bangladeshi ministers and security officials, including Prime Minister Sheikh Hasina for alleged torture, forced disappearance, extrajudicial executions and mass killings.

2021 anti-Modi protests

On the news of arrival of Narendra Modi during Bangladesh 50th year of independence celebrations on 26 March. Accusing Modi of being anti-Muslim, Hefazat-e-Islam started protesting against invitation of Modi. "A leader like Modi should not attend the [Independence Day] event who continues to persecute Muslims in India," said Nurul Islam, leader of Hefazat-e-Islam Bangladesh.

26-28 March protests
After the arrival of Narendra Modi in Bangladesh, Hefazat-e-Islam supporters gathered at Baitul Mukarram National Mosque, Dhaka on 26 March after the Friday prayer. During the protests, a deadly conflict started when supporters of Awami League tried to stop the protesters from waving their shoes as a sign of disrespect to Modi. This resulted in violent clashes from both sides. Protesters were dispersed by police using tear gas and rubber bullets injuring scores of people. After the incident, the violence then spread to several key districts in the country. The attack in Baitul Mukarram infuriated students at Hathazari of Chittagong, the stronghold of Hefazat students. Students came out in the street to protest the attack on their fellows. The demonstration was obstructed by Police while passing the Hathazari Police Station. Angry protesters started attacking police stations, and public properties, prompting police to open fire. Four protesters died in the process. To stop the spread of news and cut off communication across the country, the government of Bangladesh blocked Facebook on March 26, from the afternoon.

Hundreds of Hefazat demonstrators returned to the streets of Dhaka on Saturday. Clashes were reported from many parts of the country. Brahmanbaria is widely affected by the violence. Hefazat supporters attacked train and government offices. Five more people were killed on Saturday. Meanwhile, Facebook and its instant messaging app, Facebook Messenger, were kept blocked across the country on Saturday.

Legal suits

Secularism lawsuit
In 2016 secular activists led by Anisuzzaman submitted a petition to remove Islam from Constitution of Bangladesh. They argued that since secularism was one of the four fundamental principles of the first 1972 constitution, it should be reinstated. Secularism was removed from the constitution in 1975, and Islam was made the state religion in 1988, during the term of Hussain Mohammad Ershad as president. In 1988 few secular minded citizens of Bangladesh had filed a petition to restore the secularism in the constitution. On 27 March 2016, a Bangladeshi court accepted a petition to remove Islam as the state religion. Hefazat-e-Islam reportedly had threatened armed resistance if Islam was dropped as the state religion. The court rejected the petition, stating that those who brought it forward did not have the right to do so. A lawyer and Hefazat spokesperson argued that having Islam as the state religion would not affect minority religions. "Minorities will not be discriminated against as there is a guarantee in the constitution for the minorities." They also noted that the petition was unnecessary as Bangladeshi Muslims were respectful of minority religions and "set a tremendous example of communal harmony even after having Islam as state religion."

Lady Justice statue

In 2017 supporters of Hefazat-e Islam protested against the display of a figure of the Greek goddess of justice at the supreme court, calling it a measure and conspiracy to undermine Islam in Bangladesh. Hefazat-e-Islam later petitioned the Supreme Court of Bangladesh to remove the statue which was supported by the Awami League-backed Bangladesh Awami Olama League and a news editor.

Controversy

Allegations of links with Jamaat e Islami 
The Awami League government alleges that Hefazat is front for Jamaat e Islami and seeks to derail the International tribunals for the war crimes committed in 1971, by Hefazat denies any role with Jamaat e Islami, and alleges that this is a libel to subjugate Islamists in public life. Analysts also say that any relationship claim is baffling as Ahmad Shafi belongs to a band of Islamists that unlike Jamaat, did not oppose the independence of Bangladesh, and supported a united India and rejected the creation of Pakistan in 1947. The German ambassador in Bangladesh Albrecht Conze opined that Hifazat demands fundamentalism in Bangladesh. However, in 2014, diplomats from the American embassy in Bangladesh met with the leaders of Hefazat and discussed their demands.

Allegations of links with pro-Taliban leaders 
Maulana Habibur Rahman, a madrasa principal of Sylhet and one of the organizers of Hefazat-e Islam's 5 May protest, claimed that he met Osama Bin Laden, with members of the banned militant organization Harkat-ul Jihad al-Islami, in 1998. However, Hefazat leaders have condemned Harkat-ul Jihad al-Islami and Al Qaeda and its leader Ayman al-Zawahiri. In 2014 spokesman Azizul Haque Islamabadi said:
There is prevailing a congenial and peaceful environment in Bangladesh. People are living in peace and in such a situation the announcement by Al Qaeda chief Zawahiri has made the people fearful and worried. Bangladesh had experienced earlier militant activities and terrorism by Jama’atul Mujahideen Bangladesh and Harkat-ul Jihad. But they could not emerge successful and Al Qaeda would not come out successful in Bangladesh despite their announcement.

Explosion at affiliated madrasa
On 7 October 2013, an explosion occurred at a madrasah run by Hefazat-e-Islam's leader Mufti Izharul Islam Chowdhury driven Al Jamiatul Ulum Al Islamia Madrasa at Lal Khan Bazar, Chittagong. Police reportedly seized explosives after the raid. The madrasa authorities had claimed that computers' UPS of the school and laptops had exploded.

See also 
 List of Deobandi organisations
 Shah Ahmad Shafi
 Islam in Bangladesh
 2013 Shahbag protests
 2021 anti-Modi protests in Bangladesh

References

Further reading
 
 

 
Islamic organisations based in Bangladesh
Bangladeshi Islamists
Far-right politics in Bangladesh
Organizations established in 2010
Deobandi organisations
2010 establishments in Bangladesh